The Men's 20 km Race Walk at the 1984 Summer Olympics in Los Angeles, California had an entry list of 42 competitors. Four athletes did not start in the final, held on August 3, 1984.

Medalists

Abbreviations

Records

Final ranking

See also
 1982 Men's European Championships 20 km Walk (Athens)
 1983 Men's World Championships 20 km Walk (Helsinki)
 1984 Men's Friendship Games 20 km Walk (Moscow)
 1984 Race Walking Year Ranking
 1986 Men's European Championships 20 km Walk (Stuttgart)
 1987 Men's World Championships 20 km Walk (Rome)

References

External links
  Results

 1
Racewalking at the Olympics
Men's events at the 1984 Summer Olympics